Alexandra Yegorovna Makovskaya (1837 in Moscow – 1915 in Moscow) was a Russian landscape painter.

Biography 
Makovskaya was the eldest child of Egor Makovsky, one of the founders of the Moscow School of Painting, Sculpture and Architecture. He encouraged all of his children to become artists and gave them lessons. Alexandra, Konstantin, Nikolay and Vladimir followed in his footsteps. His youngest child, Mariya, became an actress.

After her parents were divorced, Makovskaya lived with her mother in Saint Petersburg. In 1866, she began to exhibit her paintings at the Imperial Academy of Arts. She also exhibited with the Peredvizhniki from 1878 to 1893 and the Moscow Society of Lovers of Fine Art from 1881 to 1896. After 1902, she participated in the showings of Mir Iskusstva. Sources differ as to whether she died in Saint Petersburg or returned to Moscow at the beginning of World War I. Her works have never been catalogued.

In 1997, a major retrospective of works by the entire Makovsky family was held at the Tretyakov Gallery.

References 

1837 births
1915 deaths
19th-century painters from the Russian Empire
20th-century Russian painters
Russian landscape painters
Russian women painters
Artists from Moscow
19th-century women artists from the Russian Empire
20th-century Russian women artists
Moscow School of Painting, Sculpture and Architecture alumni